The 1952 Delaware State Hornets football team represented Delaware State College—now known as Delaware State University—as a member of the Central Intercollegiate Athletic Association (CIAA) in the 1952 college football season. Led by coach Willard S. Jones in his second year, the Hornets compiled a 1–7 record, being shut out three times and outscored 48 to 205.

Schedule

References

Delaware State
Delaware State Hornets football seasons
Delaware State Hornets football